The Knights of Columbus Hall in Pascagoula, Mississippi, also known as Krebs House, is a Mississippi Landmark.

It was listed as a Mississippi Landmark in 2008.

References

Knights of Columbus buildings in the United States
Pascagoula, Mississippi
Buildings and structures in Jackson County, Mississippi
Mississippi Landmarks
Clubhouses in Mississippi